The following is an incomplete list of accidents that occur at a level crossing; in other words, this list only includes railway accidents that occur at-grade and not separated from other traffic by bridges and overpasses. Note that this list is incomplete with many countries not reporting accidents, or only listing accidents of a certain level of severity and loss of life.

Argentina 

  11 October 1935 – Near Naón a bus was hit by a train. Ten killed
  11 June 1962 – Villa Soldati level crossing tragedy, Buenos Aires: 42 people were killed and 88 injured when a bus was hit by an express train.
  1 February 1964 – A train hit a bus near Paraná. 20 killed and 16 injured.
  10 January 1965 – Near La Plata a bus was hit by a train. Eight killed and twenty-nine injured
  31 October 1984 – San Justo level crossing disaster: at least 48 people died and 16 were injured when a local bus was hit by a commuter train.
  12 May 1992 – A car was hit by a freight train in the village of the Andino, province of Santa Fe. Ten children and one adult died.
  9 March 2008 – Dolores, Buenos Aires: a bus collided with a passenger train, killing 18 and injuring at least 65, when the bus driver ignored the crossing warning devices.
  13 September 2011 – Flores, Buenos Aires: a bus collided with a passenger train on a level crossing, derailing the train, which crashed into another train standing in Flores Station.  11 people were killed and 228 injured.  The bus driver had ignored the crossing warning lights and partly lowered barrier.
  2 November 2011 – A freight train collided with a school bus in a rural area of San Luis Province, 8 girls were killed and 41 were injured.

Australia 
  8 May 1943 – Australia's worst road-rail crash. Steam locomotive A2 863 hit a bus carrying soldiers at Tallangatta Road, Wodonga resulting in the death of 25 people.
  24 February 1951 – 11 people killed in a collision between a bus and a train at a level crossing near Horsham, Victoria.
  1 June 1952 – Nine killed in bus-train accident at a level crossing at Boronia, Victoria.
  1 April 1970 - In Roseworthy, near Adelaide, fifteen were killed and twenty injured in a bus - train collision
  10 February 1994 – A Sydney Tangara train collided with a Toyota near Vineyard in the city's North West. The train derailed, causing serious damage to the lead car, car D6274. The Toyota rolled over, seriously injuring the two occupants.
  27 January 2001 – Gerogery level crossing accident – Five killed.
  24 October 2002 – an interstate passenger train struck a bus and car stopped on a level crossing at Salisbury – four killed, 26 injured.
  5 August 2004 – Three killed when a Sprinter passenger train collided with a car stopped on a level crossing at St Albans, Victoria.
  11 August 2005 – a motorist ignored flashing level crossing lights at Horsham.
  28 April 2006 – Two killed and 28 injured when a passenger train collided with a truck transporting a 14-tonne granite block, at a passively-protected crossing at Trawalla in western Victoria.
  25 May 2006 – Lismore level crossing accident – a truck collided with a train at a passively-protected crossing in fog. Truck driver killed.
  10 March 2007 - A train collided with a truck at Back Creek, New South Wales. The three locomotives (8147, 48106 and 48155) were destroyed by a fire that was caused by the crash.
  5 June 2007 – Kerang train crash  – 11 passengers killed when a truck collided with a passenger train, slicing open two carriages. Warning lights protecting the crossing were working.
  22 August 2007 – Somerville–Tyabb – truck driver killed. Flashing lights protecting the crossing were working. There were no boom barriers.
  29 April 2008 – The vehicle of a 'P-Plate' driver was hit by train while stopped on a crossing in Murrumbeena, Victoria
  18 November 2008 – A Connex Melbourne express train collided with a car in Dandenong South, Victoria, killing the car's 53-year-old female occupant, after she failed to stop at an actively-protected crossing.
  1 January 2009 – One person was killed and six others injured after a QR Sunlander train collided with a garbage truck at a level crossing with no boom gates or warning lights, near Innisfail, Queensland.
  14 November 2011 – One killed after a train collided with car at Toorak Road level crossing in Kooyong, Victoria.
  28 November 2011 – A train collided with a tip truck stopped on the Springvale Road level crossing in Springvale, Victoria.
  16 March 2012 – One killed after train collided with car at Cheltenham, Victoria.
  25 May 2012 – One person killed after a freight train collided with a car stopped on the Cherry Road level crossing in Werribee, Victoria.
  27 Oct 2012 – Reservoir, Victoria – a train collided with a truck at High Street level crossing with operational boom gates, bells and lights.
  3 Nov 2012 – Dandenong South, Victoria – A truck ran through Abbotts Road level crossing with operational boom gates, bells and lights, and hit an outbound Cranbourne suburban train travelling at 115 km/h (71 mph). 1 killed, 13 injured, including the train driver.
  21 April 2016 – Coralville, NSW – Mother drove through level crossing, colliding with goods train. Mother and 3 daughters injured.
  27 February 2020 – Two people were killed when a Pacific National freight train lead by locomotive NR84 collided with a Ford Ranger in Mallala.
  2 April 2020 - A freight train lead by locomotive 8161 collided with a coach in Geelong, Victoria.
  12 August 2021 - A suburban train collided with a truck in Glen Iris, Melbourne.

Austria 
  August 24, 1935, in a crossing located between stations of Tristing and Overtisting a train smashed into a bus. Six killed and fourteen injured
  October 22, 1975, near the town of Höbersdorf a train crash into a school bus in an unguarded level crossing. Seven killed and forty three injured.

Azerbaijan 
  August 30, 2012, six die and forty seven were injured in a bus-train collision near Baku.

Bangladesh 
  July 12, 2006 – Akkelpur level crossing disaster – A Sayedpur-Khudna passenger train smash into a passenger bus in Jaipurhat, which killed 32 with injured 30 people. 
  16 April 2008 – According to ATN Bangla television, a Dinajpur–Dhaka Ekoto Express train hit a local bus on a level crossing outside of Kalihati, Tangail, Bangladesh, killing 18 and injuring 30.

Belgium 
  November 12, 1974, five killed and several injured in a school bus - train collision near Kortemark.

Brazil 

  March 27, 1931 – Near Caxias a train smashed into a bus – six killed
  June 7, 1951 – Nova Iguaçu level crossing disaster — a commuter train smashed into a truck carrying gasoline, and at least 54 people were killed.

Canada 

  November 29, 1960 – School bus struck by train near Lamont, Alberta. 17 students killed.
  October 7, 1966 – Dorion level crossing accident – 19 killed
  December 12, 1975 – A TTC bus travelling east on St. Clair Ave. E. collided with a westbound GO Transit train at the level crossing just west of Midland Ave. Nine people were killed and 20 others injured. This was the worst accident in terms of loss of life in the history of the TTC and GO Transit systems. The level crossing was replaced by an overpass a few years later.
  June 20, 1979 – Car collides with Via Rail train near Pointe à la Garde, Quebec. Five killed.
  January 15, 1989 – Car collides with Canadian National Railway freight train near Sarnia, Ontario. Five killed.
  January 14, 1990 – Truck collides with Via Rail train near Pembroke, Ontario. Two killed.
  February 6, 1990 – Via Rail train strikes a car near Lancaster, Ontario. Two killed.
  June 10, 1990 – Via Rail train strikes a car near Alexandria, Ontario; warning sign removed by vandals. Two killed.
  February 11, 1992 – Via Rail train strikes a tractor trailer near Coteau-du-Lac, Quebec. Four train passengers killed; 48 injured.
  August 25, 1992 – Via Rail train strikes a van north of Cornwall, Ontario. Two killed; six injured.
  August 27, 1992 – Via Rail train strikes a van north of Cornwall, Ontario. Two killed.
  October 11, 1992 – Logging truck collides with Ontario Northland Railway passenger train near New Liskeard, Ontario. Truck driver and several train passengers were injured.
  September 5, 1993 – Via Rail train strikes car near Stratford, Ontario. Six killed.
  October 24, 1993 – Via Rail train strikes police cruiser near Casselman, Ontario. Two killed.
  December 21, 1993 – Car collides with Canadian Pacific Railway freight train near Osgoode, Ontario. One injured.
  December 26, 1993 – Canadian Pacific Railway freight train strikes car near Arnprior, Ontario. One killed; two injured.
  August 5, 1994 – Van collides with Canadian National Railway freight train near Kanata, Ontario. One killed.
  September 30, 1994 – Car collides with freight train in Gatineau, Quebec. Two injured.
  December 16, 1994 – Via Rail train strikes tractor trailer in Smiths Falls, Ontario. No injuries.
  February 13, 1998 – Tractor trailer collides with Via Rail train near Carlsbad Springs, Ontario. One killed.
  February 21, 1998 – Via Rail train collides with vehicle in Montague Township, Ontario. One killed; four injured.
  November 30, 1998 – Ottawa Valley RaiLink freight train collides with vehicle near Carleton Place, Ontario. One injured.
  March 29, 1999 – Car collides with Canadian Pacific Railway freight train near Kemptville, Ontario. Driver survives.
  November 19, 1999 – Canadian Pacific Railway freight train strikes SUV near Milton, Ontario. One killed; two injured.
  July 25, 2000 – Car hit by train north of Cornwall, Ontario. One killed.
  September 2000 – Via Rail train strikes vehicle near Limehouse, Ontario. Three people killed.
  September 3, 2000 – Passenger car collides with Chemin de Fer Québec Sud freight train near Brigham, Quebec. Four killed.
  May 13, 2002 – Via Rail train collides with tractor-trailer after warning gates failed to operate. Occupants escaped but vehicle struck.
  January 2, 2008 – Vehicle collides with freight train near Franktown, Ontario. One injured.
  August 4, 2008 – Freight train strikes ATV near Shawville, Quebec. One injured.
  September 3, 2008 – Ottawa Valley Railway freight train collides with passenger van near Braeside, Ontario. Two injured.
  January 24, 2009 – A train collided with an empty police cruiser left at the crossing on Wallace Avenue, in Toronto.
  January 25, 2009 – A man was killed in Vanier after his car collided with a train on one of the last two level crossings in Quebec City.
  October 14, 2009 - Passenger train collided with vehicle stopped on tracks, in Nanaimo, British Columbia. Two killed, one injured.
  2009– A Canadian National train collides with a flatbed truck in Vancouver. No one is hurt or killed.
  May 2010 – Via Rail train strikes truck in northwestern Alberta. Three people were killed.
  October 26, 2010 – Via Rail train collides with SUV north of Kingston, Ontario. One killed; one critically injured.
  September 18, 2013 – 2013 Ottawa bus–train crash – OC Transpo double-decker bus collides with Via Rail train near the Barrhaven neighbourhood of Ottawa. Six people were killed and 34 were injured.

Chile 

  June 26, 1928 - Unknown place, 7 dead and 27 injured
  August 13, 1999, a train collided with a schoolbus at Longaví. 8 killed and 20 injured.

China 
  December 23, 1988 – Qinghemen level crossing disaster – A local bus hit by passenger train in Shenyang, at least 46 were killed and 63 were injured. 
  January 17, 1989 – Huinan level crossing disaster – A local bus hit by passenger train, at least 32 were killed. 
  January 31, 1993 – Gaotaishan level crossing disaster – A Chifeng-Dalian passenger train smashed into an overcrowded bus, which killed 66 people with injured 29 in Liaoning. 
  April 30, 1993 – Yingkou level crossing disaster – A passenger train smashed into a bus, which killed 36 people and injured 38 in Liaoning. 
  September 16, 1999 – Yibin level crossing disaster – At least 25 people were killed and 24 people were injured, when a passenger train smashed into a school bus. 
  December 24, 2001 – Artux level crossing disaster – At least 28 people were killed and eleven people were injured, when a mini bus hit by Ürümqi–Kashgar passenger train in Xinjiang.

Hong Kong 
 29 July 1994 – A LRT vehicle hit by a container lorry, at a level crossing at the injunction of Wu King Road and Wu Shan Road in Tuen Mun, operator killed, four injured.

Colombia 

  January 11, 1970, Santa Marta, a train collided with a bus. 36 killed and 24 injured.

Cuba 
  July 27, 1935 - Near Matanzas a train hit a bus. 15 die and more other injured
  November 7, 1997 – Holguin level crossing disaster – A local bus hit by Havana–Santiago de Cuba passenger train, at least fifty-six were killed and six were injured. 
  October 6, 2007 – Veguita level crossing disaster – A local bus hit by Santiago de Cuba-Manzanillo passenger train near the village of Veguita, in the municipality of Yara. At least twenty-eight people died and seventy-three were injured.

Czech Republic 
  July 22, 2015 – Studénka train crash – A Bohumín-Františkovy Lázně pendolino train smash into a lorry of driver of Polish nationality in Studénka, which killed 3 and injured 17 people.

Denmark 

  May 1, 1966 - A bus - train collision near Herning leaves a death toll of almost ten people.

Egypt 
  19 March 1936 - Unknown place - A train smashed into a bus - Fourteen killed and seventeen injured
  20 October 1979 – Imbaba level crossing disaster – A suburban passenger train smashed into a public bus in Giza Governorate, which killed 28 and injured 30 people. 
  11 December 1987 – According to the Egyptian government, a bus carrying local primary school children returning from the Giza Zoo was smashed by a high-speed train at an unmarked railroad level crossing at Ain Shams, on the outskirts Cairo, Egypt, killing 62 children and injuring 67.
  16 April 1995 – Al Minufiyah level crossing disaster; At least forty-nine textile workers were killed, when a bus was hit by an express train. 
  16 July 2008 – Marsa Matruh a truck failed to stop pushing waiting traffic into the path of the train. At least 40 killed.
  17 November 2012 – Manfalut train accident, a school bus carrying about 60 pre-school children between four and six years old was hit by a train on a rail crossing near Manfalut, 350 km (230 miles) south of the Egyptian capital Cairo. At least 50 children and the bus driver were killed in the crash. About 17 people were also injured.
  18 November 2013 – bus hit by a train at a crossing by warning light and chain, at Dahshour near Giza – 26 killed – returning from wedding

France 
  February 8, 1921 - A military bus was hit by a train near the station in Saint-Étienne. 10 killed and 2 seriously injured
  October 19, 1979 – Séméac level crossing disaster – An express train crashed into a Spanish coach carrying pilgrims returning from Rome, killing 21 and injuring 29. In 1980, the city of San Sebastian awarded a Golden Drum to the people of Tarbes for the support they provided during this event.
  July 8, 1985 - Saint-Pierre-du-Vauvray Accident - A collision between a train and a truck killed 17 people and injured 99. A tunnel was later built to provide better safety.
  September 8, 1997 - Port-Sainte-Foy Accident - A collision with a gasoline tanker. 13 killed, 43 injured. The truck driver and company were condemned. After the collision, a list of specific level crossing was established. The decision is made to replace 15 level crossings with bridges or tunnels each year.
  June 2, 2008 - Allinges Accident - A train hit a bus carrying middle schoolers, killing 7 and injuring 25. It was decided to add additional traffic lights and to limit bus/coach traffic where appropriate
  December 14, 2017 - Perpignan crash - A school bus was hit at a level crossing. 6 deaths and 24 injuries, with the cause unclear.

Germany 

  1 January 1930 - In Berlín a train struck a bus - Five killed and ten seriously injured

  20 June 1959 – Lauffen bus crash — A crowded bus collided with a train on a level crossing in Lauffen, West Germany killing 45, the worst bus accident in German history at that time. 
  July 6, 1967 – Langenweddingen level crossing disaster — 94 killed.
  March 7, 1975, in Munich a bus - train collision leaves twelve killed and five seriously injured.
  Ibbenbüren train collision 16 May 2015 — A tractor trailer became stuck at the level carrying liquid manure became stuck at a level crossing at Ibbenbüren, North Rhine-Westphalia, Germany when it was hit by a Stadler FLIRT train. Twenty-two people were hurt (six seriously) and two killed including a passenger.

Greece 

  December 1929 - A train smashed into a bus at a crossing near Okchilar station en route from Xandhria to Drama. 12 killed and 6 injured.

Hungary 
  January 30, 1973 – Helvecia level crossing disaster – A commuter train smashed into a regular route bus, at least thirty-seven people were killed and eighteen people were injured.
  May 8, 2003 – Lake Balaton level crossing disaster – A double-decker bus from Germany hit by Budapest–Nagykanizsa express train, at least thirty-four were killed and forty-two were injured.

India 
  December 9, 1964 – Deoria level crossing disaster — A bus hit by a passenger train in Uttar Pradesh, at least twenty-nine people were killed and seventy-two people were injured. 
  May 16, 1968 – An express train crashed into a bus at an unmanned railway crossing near Brecha railway station, killed 30 people and injured 35.
  September 11, 1986 – Pathali Pahar level crossing disaster — A local bus hit by a passenger train in Assam, at least twenty-eight people were killed and sixty people injured. 
  March 20, 1991 – Annupur level crossing disaster — A bus hit by many vehicles and following hit a passenger train in Madhya Pradesh, at least thirty-five people died, twenty-seven people injured. 
  December 10, 1993 – Poona level crossing disaster – A Sahyadi Express train crashed into a bus carrying school-children in Maharashtra, which killed 38 and injured 41 people. 
  May 3, 1994 – A passenger train rammed into a tractor in Andhra Pradesh, killing 35 people.
  May 14, 1996 – A passenger train crashed into a bus in Kerala, killing 35 people.
  May 25, 1996 – A passenger train crashed into a tractor trailer in Uttar Pradesh, killing 25 people.
  April 1999 – Jhukia level crossing disaster — A bus with a wedding party hit by passenger train, at least 45 people were killed.
  February 2, 2005 – A passenger train crashed into a tractor-trailer carrying over 60 people at the Nagpur level crossing, killing over 55 people.
  July 7, 2011 – Dariyaiganj level crossing accident – A Mathura-Chhapra passenger train rammed into a bus, carrying wedding guests in Kanshiram Nagar, Uttar Pradesh, which killed 38 persons and injured another 32.
  April 26, 2018 – Dudhinagar level crossing accident - A fast passenger train crashed into a school bus - thirteen children died and eight were seriously injured. Crash happened near Dudhinagar, district of Kushinagar, Uttar Pradesh.

Indonesia 
  January 20, 1932 – In an unknown place a train collided into a bus – seven killed and twelve injured.
  November 4, 1997 – Kotabumi level crossing disaster – An express train smashed into a bus in Sumatra, which killed 26 and injured 5 people. 
  November 3, 2001 – Serang level crossing disaster – A freight train smashed into a bus, carrying local pilgrim in West Java, which killed 20 people. 
 December 9, 2013 – 2013 Bintaro train crash - A commuter train smashed into a Pertamina tanker truck in Jakarta and derail, which killed 7 people including the drivers, assistant engineer, and the train technician. At least 73 Passenger were injured.
 May 4, 2014 – Cirebon Train Derailment - Bogowonto train which pulled by CC206 hit a container truck and derail at Cirebon grade crossing. There were no passengers killed in the accident, but the derailment makes other trains behind schedule. 
 December 6, 2015 – A Commuter Line hit Metromini city bus in Angke station level crossing, killing 18 people inside the Metromini but no victim from train side. The front body of Commuter Line was severely damaged. This accident also led to Metromini future ban, gradually replaced by lines of Transjakarta. Several level crossings in Jakarta were going to be closed prior to this accident.
 April 6, 2018 – Sancaka 86 derailment - Sancaka train 86 hit a concrete carrier trailer truck and derailed at Ngawi, killing the train's driver.
February 27 – Tulungagung level crossing crash - 5 people died and several injured after a bus carrying 41 passengers was hit by an passenger train in Tulungagung.

Israel 
  June 12, 1985 – HaBonim disaster – A passenger train smashed into a bus carrying school children, at least twenty-two people were killed and seventeen were injured.

Italy 
  October 2, 1922, a train hit a bus near Erbè. 6 killed and 14 injured.
  July 6, 1925, a train smashed into a bus near Siena. 4 killed and an unknown number of injured.
  September 26, 1934, Bus - train collision near Terno d'Isola, 9 were dead and 8 seriously injured.
  November 15, 1960, in Mandela, near Roma, a bus was struck by a train, killing seven and injuring other two.
  September 11, 1972, in Summaga di Portogruaro (Veneto) a train struck a bus. Five died and fifteen more were injured.

Japan 

  June 10, 1958 – Nantan, Kyoto: 4 people were killed and 88 injured. Steam locomotive collided with an elementary school charter bus.
  January 3, 1959 – Osaka, Osaka: 7 people were killed and 13 injured. A bus was hit by Hankyu Express train, which caused by the delayed closing of the crossing signalman.
  December 12, 1960 – Maniwa, Okayama: 10 people were killed and 50 injured. A bus was hit by the train at the crossing without crossing signal.
  September 22, 1966, in Koshiya (¿?, sic) a bus - train collision leaves 6 dead and more 40 injured
  September 20, 1963 – Fukuoka, Fukuoka: 8 people were killed. 4-car train collided with a truck and derailed, and another 1-car train collided with the derailed train.
  April 1, 1967 – Sennan, Osaka: 5 people were killed and 208 injured. The train collided with a truck and derailed.
  December 9, 1969 – Tatebayashi, Gunma: 7 people were killed and 101 injured. The train collided with a crane truck.
  March 30, 1970 – Shimonoseki, Yamaguchi: 5 people were killed and 29 injured. The train collided with a concrete mixer lorry and derailed.
  March 4, 1971 – Fujiyoshida, Yamanashi : 17 people were killed and 71 injured. the train collided with a small truck, and brake device of the train malfunctioned.

South Korea 
  January 1954 – Osan level crossing disaster — A truck, carrying an army infantry school, smashed into local passenger train, at least 56 people died and many were injured in Hwaseong, Gyeonggi-do. 
  January 9, 1969 - Unknown place - a bus was hit by a train. 19 dead and 7 injured.
  October 14, 1970 – Mosan level crossing disaster — A charter bus was hit by an express train. 46 people were killed and 30 injured.

Kenya 
  August 17, 2000 – 6 die in Kisumu, after a freight train hits a packed bus on a busy level crossing during the morning rush hour.
  October 30, 2013 - Bus - train collision in Nairobi, 11 killed and 30 injured.

Mexico 

  August 19, 1930, near Puebla a locomotive collided into a bus. Four die and seven are injured
  January 30, 1969, a bus - train collision near Puebla is settled with a balance of 14 killed and 4 injured
  April 11, 1971. In San Cristobal Ecatepec a bus train collision left seven dead and 12 injured.
  February 8, 1975 – Cuautitlan level crossing accident — A Mexico City–Ciudad Juárez passenger train smash into an express bus, at least twenty-nine people died and thirty-two people were injured on February 8, 1975. 
  January 17, 1977 – Tianepantla level crossing disaster — A passenger train smashed into a local bus, at least forty-two people were killed. 
  August 15, 1982 – Tula level crossing disaster — an express bus hit by Nuevo Laredo-Mexico City passenger train, at least twenty-three people were killed and thirty-two people were injured. 
  February 25, 1989 – Saltillo level crossing disaster — A passenger train smashed into a local bus, at least twenty-two people were killed. 
  January 14, 1990 – Léon level crossing disaster — A local bus hit by a freight train, at least thirty-three people died and twenty-six people were injured. 
  1997 – Mexico City a commuter train hit a fuel tanker at a crossing and later exploded killing at least 20 people; the explosion was recorded by a news helicopter.
  December 2006 – Cuautilan level crossing disaster — A passenger bus hit by thirty-six cars of a freight train and killing at least twenty-eight, another fourteen were injured.

Moldova
  November 1, 2011, near Novie Aneni a train smashed into a bus. 8 killed and 20 injured.

Morocco

  March 1, 2000 – Ksar el-Kebir – A train crashed into a tractor trailer that carried 50 agricultural workers – 36 killed and 10 injured – Accident was due to fog.
  May 20, 2012 - near Ben Guerir a School Bus was struck by a train killing 9 and injuring other 10.

The Netherlands
  February 17, 1944, Lisse – Truck with workers was pushed onto the crossing after a collision with another truck and was hit by train, 9 killed, many injured.
 May 25, 1954, Zandbulten – Bus with wedding guests was hit by train, 6 dead and ca. 20 injured.
  October 10, 1977 – IJsselmuiden – Car was hit by train on level crossing, 6 killed.
  July 22, 1986 – Brummen – Van, transporting mentally disabled, gets hit by train on level crossing, 6 dead, 2 injured.
 June 16, 2000, Klarenbeek – Car with caravan drove through a red light at a rail crossing and was struck by train, family of 5 killed.
 February 23, 2016, Dalfsen train crash involving slow-moving elevated work platform on steel caterpillar tracks.

New Zealand
  August 25, 1993 – Rolleston — A truck fails to stop for level crossing alarms and hits the side of a southbound Southerner express passenger train, killing three people and seriously injuring seven.

  November 14, 1996 – Hilderthorpe, North Otago - The Southerner passenger train was involved in a level-crossing crash at Hilderthorpe, North Otago, killing four people.
  March 22, 1997 – Trentham – A Wellington to Upper Hutt suburban service hits a car on a level crossing after the alarms and barrier arms failed to activate, injuring three people. The train driver had passed a signal at danger immediately before the crossing.
  January 8, 2001 – Canterbury - The Southerner passenger train hit a cattle truck on a level crossing crash. The DC-class locomotive and two of three passenger carriages were derailed, injuring 21 passengers and forcing the destruction of 10 cattle-beasts.
  October 31, 2011 – At Paekakariki, Wellington a 12.6-metre-long three-axle low-floor bus became stuck on the Beach Road level crossing waiting at a stop sign to turn right onto State Highway 1, and was hit by a southbound freight train. No injuries were reported. The accident was caused by the bus stopping in a position where its single driving axle was off the ground above a drain, combined with an insufficient 'stacking distance' between the level crossing and State Highway 1, meaning any vehicle over 10 metres long could not stop without encroaching either the railway line or the State Highway.
  February 22, 2014, Rangiriri – The southbound Northern Explorer travelling from Auckland to Wellington with 108 passengers on board collided with an articulated truck at the level crossing on Te Onetea Road. The 28-year-old driver of the truck died at the scene. The TAIC investigation found two safety issues contributing to the accident.

Pakistan 
  October 1987 – Moro level crossing disaster — At least 50 people died and 40 were injured, when a passenger train smashed into a bus. 
  September 2003 – Malikwal level crossing disaster — A bus hit by Lalamusa-Surghuda local train, at least twenty-seven were killed and six injured. 
  January 2010 – Mian Channun town, about 100 kilometres east of the central city of Multan in Punjab province – in fog – School bus – 9 killed and 18 injured.

Philippines 
 May 15, 1972. One of the two train mishaps that happened on this date was a bus-train collision in Angeles, Pampanga. A northbound JMC class DMU hit a La Mallorca–Pambusco bus, exploding its gas tank and setting a fire on. At least 10 people were killed and "scores" more were reported to be injured.
 1968. MC class DMU led by unit No. 324 collided with an overloaded Volkswagen Beetle in Barrio Real (today Barangay Real), Calamba, Laguna, resulting in 8 deaths. It was ruled out that the Beetle was overtaking a jeepney. The car was then displayed near the crossing as a warning for motorists attempting to ignore level crossings.

Poland 
  February 22, 1932. Bus - train collision in Varsovia. Ten people killed and twelve seriously injured.
  January 19, 1952. Seventeen people were killed after a train collided with a truck in Występa.
  December 6, 1962. Nine killed and three more seriously injured when a train struck a bus in Mińsk Mazowiecki
  September 19, 1985. Six people were killed and fourteen were injured after a freight train collided with a city bus Jelcz PR110U in Olsztyn.
  July 30, 2012. Nine people were killed and one person was seriously injured after a train and a minibus collided in the Polish town of Bratoszewice.
  November 15, 2007. Two people were killed after a train collided with a truck, when the truck driver had ignored lights and KLD-40 type bells in Poledno.

Portugal 

  August 24, 1933, near Ceira (Coimbra District), a train struck into a bus. Four killed and twenty-three injured.
  May 2, 1938. In Viana do Castelo, at 00.15 AM, on the Gontim street level crossing, a train crashed into an open-box lorry that carried more of forty people that returned from celebrations of the Labour Day. 28 of them were killed and seventeen injured.
  April 26, 1984. Terronho crossing, Recarei, Paredes – 07:30 AM – Train-Bus collision – 17 killed and over 20 injured.

Romania 
  ¿July 1?, 1931, in an unknown place a train hit a school bus, 5 dead and 22 injured
  ¿July 1?, 1935. In Pieatra-olt a bus was hit by a train. Five killed and twelve injured.
  August 14, 2009 -Scânteia train accident, at least 14 people died after a collision between a bus and a train.

Russia 
  July 7, 1990 – Petrozavodsk level crossing disaster. A local bus service from Padozero to Petrozavodsk collided with a suburban train on the Petrozavodsk-Suoyarvi route on the 14th km of the A133.  In total 33 of the 80 passengers on the bus were killed. The 11th of July was declared a day of mourning in the Karelian ASSR.
  January 21, 2006 – Voronezhskay level crossing disaster — At least 21 people were dead and six were injured, when a bus carrying factory workers hit by Mineralnye Vody–Krasnodar passenger train. 
  6 October 2017 - A train travelling from St. Petersburg to Nizhny-Novgorod collided with a bus at a level crossing in the city of Vladimir, killing 16 people. The bus was suspected to have been stalled due to an engine malfunction.

Serbia 
  December 21, 2018, At Donje Medjurovo, near Niš, a school bus - train collision causes five killed and thirty injured

Slovakia 

  21 February 2009 – Slovakian coach and train collision − 12 killed − lights but no booms.

South Africa 
  July 12, 1966 - Near Bergietersrus a train collided into a bus. Twenty five killed and twenty eight injured.
  January 28, 1970 – Henley on Klip level crossing disaster — An express train hit a bus carrying local students, killing 23 and injuring 16.
  June 7, 1980 – Empangeni level crossing disaster — Nkilini–Empangeni passenger train hit a bus, killing 69 and injuring 93 people.
  2005 – Johannesburg level crossing accident — 9 killed.
  November 12, 2006 – Faure level crossing accident — A Metrorail commuter train hit a truck carrying local farmworkers, killing 19 and injuring 6.
  August 25, 2010 – Blackheath level crossing accident —  A Metrorail commuter train hit a minibus filled with school children, killing 10. Accident allegedly due to the minibus driver's negligence.
  July 13, 2012 – Hectorspruit level crossing accident — A goods train hauling coal from Witbank to Maputo smashed into a truck carrying 44 farm workers near Hectorspruit, Mpumalanga, killing 26 people.
  January 4, 2018 – Hennenman–Kroonstad train crash — A truck trying to beat a passenger train through a crossing was struck by it, killing 21.

Spain 

  December 19, 1929 – Gelida level crossing accident – Gelida (Barcelona) – Bus-train collision – 17 killed and 8 injured.
  April 17, 1930 – Gilet level crossing accident – Gilet (Valencia) – Bus-train collision – 13 killed and 20 injured.
  June 10, 1934 – La Pola de Gordon crossing accident – La Pola de Gordón (León) – Bus-train collision – 20 killed and 11 injured.
  July 15, 1937 - Mail train from Cartagena to Madrid hit a truck loaded with explosives at a crossing near Cieza (Murcia) - At least fourteen people die and more 200 resulted injured.
  March 29, 1938, in Meliana (Valencia) a train struck a tanker lorry loaded with gasoline. The number of victims is unknown, supposed 23 killed and several injured.
  September 7, 1938 - A train hit a lorry loaded with gasoline near to Sarriá de Ter (Gerona), killing 19 and injuring 21 more.
  January 24, 1951 - In Vinallop (Tarragona) mail train from Valencia to Barcelona hit a truck and derailed. 14 killed and more 30 injured
  June 30, 1965 – Arahal crossing accident – Arahal (Seville) – Bus-train collision – 12 killed and 30 injured
  November 23, 1976 - A train hit in a lorry loaded with iron bars in a crossing in Massalfassar (Valencia). 14 people die and 21 were injured.
  December 21, 1978 – Munoz level crossing disaster – Munoz, La Fuente de San Esteban (Salamanca) – A bus carrying school children hit by a Salamanca-bound locomotive, thirty-two people were killed and fifty-six people were injured.
  September 24, 1980 – Vara de Quart level crossing disaster – Vara de Quart, Xirivella (Valencia) – A Valencia-Madrid express train smashed into a local bus, which killed 25 and injured 28 people.
  March 25, 1988 – Juneda level crossing accident – Juneda (Lleida/Lérida) – Schoolbus-train collision – 15 killed and 23 injured.
  January 3, 2001 – Lorca level crossing accident – Lorca (Province of Murcia) – Van-train collision – 12 killed and 2 injured.

Sri Lanka 

  January 17, 1989 – Ahungalla level crossing accident, — At least fifty-one people were killed and 110 people were injured.
  April 27, 2005 – Polgahawela level crossing collision, Sri Lanka —  bus tried to beat the train at a level crossing; at least 35 people were killed.

Sweden 

  July 23, 1923 - Unknown place - A train hit into a bus - Eight killed and twenty injured.
  September 2004 - Nosaby - A truck with trailer stopped on the single track line as the barrier comes down, getting stuck between the truck and the trailer. The truckdriver leaves the cab to lift the barrier by hand. A Y2-class DMU passes the level crosing distant signal, showing "Expect clear", at 161 km/h. Seeing the crossing blocked the driver throws the train into emergency brake, slowing the train to 123 km/h at impact. The driver and one passenger is killed instantly, the guard and another passenger is severely injured; a total of 47 passengers are injured. The truckdriver is later sentenced to 1 year and 2 months in jail for causing death and reckless driving.

Switzerland 

  12 September 1982 – A bus that was carrying German tourists collided with a train on a level crossing near Zürich, Switzerland, killing 39. The barriers were not closed, because the operator pressed a wrong button. Only two passengers survived the crash.

Taiwan 
  March 11, 1961 – 27 killed, 15 injured when a south-bound passenger train (#3001 Diesel Limited Express) smashed into a truck carrying soldiers at level crossing between Linfengyin (林鳳營) and Longtien (隆田), Tainan
  July 8, 1961 – 48 killed, 28 injured when a south-bound passenger train (#11 Limited Express) smashed into a bus at level crossing in Minxong, Chiayi County.
  April 21, 1976 – Tacheng level crossing disaster – South-bound passenger train (#33 Kuan-kuang Limited Express; Kuan-kuang Hao) smashed into a bus carrying high school students in Dacun (大村), Changhua, which killed 40 and injured 42 people.
  March 8, 1981 – Hsinchu level crossing disaster — At least thirty people died and 131 people were injured, when a north-bound passenger train (#1002 Tzu-chiang Limited Express, Tzu-chiang Hao) smashed into a truck at the south shore of the Toucian River, Hsinchu.
  December 20, 1990 – Lujhu (Luzhu, 路竹) level crossing disaster — At least twenty-five people were killed and thirty-two people injured when a north-bound train (#1020 Tzu-chiang Limited Express) smashed into a tour bus.
  April 10, 2020 – Kaohsiung level crossing incident – Four people were taken to hospital after a local commuter train hit a truck on a level crossing in Kaohsiung City.

Tanzania 

  6 November 2014 – Twelve people died and others were injured when a bus collided with a train at Kiberege in Tanzania's eastern region. Six men, four women and two girls. The bus driver, who crossed without taking precautions, ran away after the incident.

Thailand 
  Korat level crossing disaster — At least forty were killed and thirty-nine were injured, when an overcrowded bus was hit by an express train in Nakhon Ratchasima in July 1967.
  Takhli level crossing disaster — A track slammed into the side of a Lopburi−Pitsanulok passenger train, at least twenty-seven were killed in May 1988.

Turkey 
  July 25, 2004, a train smashed into a bus in western turkey, 14 killed and 6 injured.

Turkmenistan 
  Keshi level crossing disaster – At least 40 people were killed when a bus was hit by a diesel locomotive train in the outskirts of Ashgabat on September 19, 1998.

Ukraine 

  June 11, 1989 – Kamenskaya Pogorelova level crossing disaster – An Adeler−Voronezh passenger train was hit by a local bus, which killed 31 and injured 14 people. (Present day Dnipropetrovsk region) 
  12 October 2010 – Marhanets train accident – Marganets level crossing disaster. A train smashed into a passenger bus in Dnipropetrovsk Oblast, which killed 45 people with 9 injured.

United Kingdom 

  Leicester and Swannington Railway 1832 train hit horse and cart; one of the first ever level crossing accidents.
  Petworth rail incident — October 1859. A steam locomotive left with its regulator open broke away from the yard at Petworth, W. Sussex, and ran loose for seventeen and a half miles to Horsham, destroying three sets of level crossing gates, before being stopped by a cleaner.
  Hixon rail crash — 6 January 1968 – 11 killed. An abnormal load (120-ton electrical transformer) was escorted across a recently-installed AHB level crossing at Hixon, Staffordshire. Warning signs were not observed and the signaller wasn't telephoned before crossing, and an electric express hit the load and derailed. The train driver, a crew member and eight passengers were killed. As a result of the crash, AHB level crossings were improved.
  Lockington rail crash — 26 July 1986 – 9 killed. A light van failed to stop at the warning lights (it had joined the road from a house next to the level crossing) at a recently-installed AOCR level crossing at Lockington, E.R. Yorkshire. The van was broken into pieces, which moved under the train and derailed it. Eight passengers on the train and a passenger in the van died. As a result of the crash, AOCR level crossings (except one) were phased-out.
  Ufton Nervet rail crash — 6 November 2004 – 7 killed. Mazda 323 (believed to be parked upon Ufton AHB level crossing by a suicidal driver) was hit by the 17:35 HST from London Paddington to Plymouth. The collision and a set of points at the Down Goods Loop caused all eight coaches to derail. The drivers of the train and car (and five rail passengers) were killed. As a result of the crash, level crossing safety as a whole was revolutionised and hundreds were closed in the years since.
  Black Horse Drove — October 2005 – 1 killed in collision with tractor
  Elsenham pedestrian accident — 3 December 2005 – 2 killed
  Wokingham, Berkshire — 2007 – 1 killed
  Wokingham, Berkshire — 2008 – 1 killed
  Halkirk, Caithness — 2009 – 3 killed
  Penrhyndeudraeth, Gwynedd – 2 Sept 2009 – 1 killed
  Wokingham, Berkshire — 2010 – 1 killed
  Little Cornard, Suffolk — 2010 – 1 with life-threatening injuries
  Chorley – 2011 – 1 killed, 1 serious injury
  Dunragit – 2012 – 1 serious injury
  Pleasants Crossing, Denver — July 2012 – 1 killed
  Athelney, Somerset – 2013 – 1 killed (car driver)
  Scampston, North Yorkshire – 2014 = 1 killed
  Lincoln – 2014 = 2 killed

United States 

  Columbus, Ohio – March 30, 1923 – A westbound Four Flyer en route to Cincinnati from Boston hit an automobile at a grade crossing derailing almost the entire train. 6 people were killed, 3 of them were the occupants of the car. The other 3 were the Engineer, the Fireman and an Ohio politician; another 14 were injured
  Round Rock, Texas - January 22, 1927 - A bus carrying a Basketball team of Baylor University was hit by a train. 7 killed.
  Albuquerque, New Mexico - April 12, 1930 - Train - Bus collision - 20 killed
  Rockville, Maryland  – April 11, 1935 – 14 killed – A Baltimore and Ohio Railroad express train struck a bus carrying students of Williamsport High School who were returning from a University of Maryland science fair. Accident occurred at (long closed) Baltimore Road crossing.
  Salt Lake City, Utah – December 1, 1938 – 23 children killed when a blizzard obscured an oncoming train at a crossing in Salt Lake County in what is now South Jordan.
  Spring City, Tennessee - August 27, 1955, 11 killed, 36 injured - A 100-car train struck the rear of a Spring City Elementary School bus as it crossed the tracks.
  1963 Chualar bus crash  – September 17, 1963 – 32 killed, 25 injured – A flatbed truck being used as a bus was hit by a freight train in Salinas Valley, California. It was the worst fatal vehicle accident in United States history, according to the National Safety Council.
 Gilchrest Road, New York crossing accident – March 24, 1972 – 5 killed.
  Fibre, Michigan – July 30, 1974 – 8 killed. A 1972 Oldsmobile station wagon, occupied by four children and four adults, collided with a Soo Line freight train at the Fibre Crossing, which did not have lights or gates installed.
  Plant City, Florida – October 1977 – 10 killed. Amtrak Passenger Train struck pickup truck that attempted to beat the train at a crossing. No injuries on the train.
  Mineola, New York – March 1982 – 9 killed, one injured. A passenger van drove around the crossing gate and was struck by a Long Island Rail Road train. 
  1995 Fox River Grove bus–train collision  –  October 25, 1995 – 7 killed.
  Bourbonnais train accident  –  1999 – An Amtrak train collided with a semi-truck and derailed most of the train. 11 killed.
  Murray County, Georgia  –  March 28, 2000 – 3 killed, CSX freight train strikes a school bus at an unsignalled crossing.
  Glendale train crash  –  2005 – 11 killed - A southbound Metrolink train hit a SUV that had been parked on the tracks immediately south of the Chevy Chase Drive level crossing, colliding with a northbound Metrolink train and a freight train parked on nearby auxiliary tracks.
  Oxnard, California 2008  – Amtrak Passenger Train struck a truck. Truck was smashed; however no injuries were reported.
  Canton, Michigan crash  –  2009 – 5 killed when the driver of a car drove around lowered railroad crossing gates and was struck in a "T-bone" manner by a westbound Wolverine train. No injuries on the train. The driver had his license suspended the day before.
  Revere, Massachusetts  –  May 2008 – Boy killed by "Second train coming" on MBTA.
  Detroit, Michigan  – March 1, 2010 – An Amtrak train struck a fire engine owned by the Detroit Fire Department on the city's southwest side.
  Midland train crash – November 15, 2012 – A Union Pacific freight train collided with a flatbed truck that was part of a parade in Midland, Texas honoring veterans of the United States Armed Forces. Four veterans were killed, while none on board the train were hurt.
  Valhalla train crash – February 3, 2015 – A Metro-North train collided with an SUV at a crossing at Valhalla, New York, resulting in 6 deaths and at least 12 injuries.
  2015 Oxnard train derailment – February 24, 2015 – 1 died, 29 injured – a Metrolink passenger train collided with a truck on a grade crossing and derailed at Oxnard, California.
  2015 Halifax train crash –March 9, 2015 – An Amtrak passenger train collided with an oversize load on a grade crossing and derailed at Halifax, North Carolina. Fifty-five people were injured.
  2018 Crozet, Virginia train crash - January 31, 2018 - A train carrying members of Congress from the Republican Party from Washington, D.C. to a retreat in White Sulphur Springs, West Virginia crashed into a garbage truck at a level crossing near Crozet, Virginia, killing the garbage truck driver.
  Westbury, New York - February 26, 2019 - Two separate Long Island Railroad trains hit a pickup truck causing the train to derail and damage the nearby LIRR platform. 3 people are killed with another 7 injured. Service on the Port Jefferson Branch and Ronkonkoma Branch was suspended between Hicksville and  the following day.
  2022 Missouri train derailment - June 27, 2022 - An Amtrak train hit a dump truck at a rural railroad crossing marked only by crossbucks and stop signs, derailing all passenger cars. Four killed, including one person in the dump truck, and approximately 150 injured.

Uruguay
 Young crossing crash – May 21, 1956 - At Young, a train crashed into a bus that travelled to Salto. Unknown number of killed, sources talk between 2 and 30.

Vietnam
 Dien Sanh train crash – March 10, 2015 – A Vietnam Railways passenger train collided with a lorry near Dien Sanh station. One person was killed and several people were injured, four seriously.

Zaire 
  July 3, 1987 – Kasumbalesa level crossing disaster – A passenger train smashed into a trailer truck, carrying local residents in Katanga Province, which killed 125 people. (present day of Democratic Republic of Congo)

Zimbabwe 
  March 8, 2007, 35 die and an unknown number were injured when a train hit in a bus near Harare.

See also 
Lists of rail accidents
List of road accidents

Notes

References 

Level crossing
Traffic collisions